Claymore is a suburb of Sydney, in the state of New South Wales, Australia. Claymore is located 54 kilometres south-west of the Sydney central business district, in the local government area of the City of Campbelltown and is part of the Macarthur region. The majority of housing in Claymore is owned by Housing NSW. The streets are named after Australian artists.

History 
The area now known as Claymore was originally home to the Tharawal people. British settlers began moving into the area in the early 19th century, establishing farms and orchards. By the 1970s, the expansion of Sydney was great enough for developers to look at the area around Campbelltown. The Housing Commission of New South Wales undertook a large public housing development in the Claymore area. Originally the suburb was to be called Badgally after a local homestead, but the council backed off over concerns that the "Bad" part of the name could give the area a "bad" name. They chose Claymore after another local property, although that was also contentious since the name had very little history in the area. The first residents moved in during 1978.

Demographics 
According to the 2016 census, Claymore had a population of 2k people.
 Aboriginal and Torres Strait Islander people made up 7.9% of the population. 
 57.3% of people were born in Australia. The next most common countries of birth were New Zealand 5.1% and Samoa 4.3%.   
 56.8% of people spoke only English at home. Other languages spoken at home included Samoan at 9.1%. 
 The median age is 23, compared to the national median of 38, with 33.2% of the population aged 14 or under. 
 The median household income is $698 per week, less than half of the national average median of $1,486.  
 94.4% of houses were rented, compared to the national average of 30.9%. There are no houses that were owned outright or with a mortgage.

Poverty 
In September 2012, an episode of the ABC program Four Corners entitled "Growing up poor" examined the lives of children in poor families in Claymore. It stated that the suburb had the youngest population in Australia. A report "Down and under" in the Al Jazeera 101 East series in February 2013 also pointed to the links between poverty and hopelessness, family tensions and violence and lack of opportunities for Claymore's children, where more than half the families have only one parent.

In the 2015 Dropping Off The Edge report, Claymore was listed as one of the most socially disadvantaged areas in New South Wales.

Services 
Claymore has a WorkVentures Connect Centre and the Kalon House of Welcome is managed by the Catholic church.

References 

City of Campbelltown (New South Wales)